Miss Earth Myanmar is a national beauty pageant in Myanmar organized by Miss Earth Myanmar Organization.

History

Miss Earth Myanmar is a beauty pageant in Myanmar where the winner represents her country at the Miss Earth pageant. The winners become an Environmental Ambassador in Myanmar and participate in environmental conservation activities.

The main purpose of the title is Beauties for a Cause.

Titleholders

Winners by City/Town

International pageants
Color keys

Miss Earth

See also 
 Miss Burma (1947–1962)
 Miss Universe Myanmar
 Miss World Myanmar
 Miss International Myanmar
 Miss Grand Myanmar
 Miss Supranational Myanmar
 Mister Myanmar

References

External links
Official website

Recurring events established in 2014
Burmese awards
Myanmar
Beauty pageants in Myanmar